Nationality words link to articles with information on the nation's poetry or literature (for instance, Irish or France).

Events
 January - "What is Poetry? And What Is It Good For?" essay by John Neal published in Sartain's Union Magazine
 November 14 - A public festival is held in Denmark to celebrate the 70th birthday of Adam Gottlob Oehlenschläger
 La Tribune des Peuples, a pan-European romantic nationalist periodical, is published between March and November by Adam Mickiewicz.

Works published

United Kingdom
 Cecil Frances Alexander, Moral Songs
 Matthew Arnold, writing under the pen name "A", The Strayed Reveller, and Other Poems
 William Edmondstoune Aytoun, Lays of the Scottish Cavaliers, and Other Poems
 Robert Browning, Poems, his first collected edition
 Sir Edward Bulwer-Lytton, King Arthur, first published in three parts, 1848–1849
 Edward Caswall, Lyra Catholica
 A. H. Clough, Ambarvalia
 Robert Southey, all posthumously published:
 Southey's Common-place Book: First Series, and Second Series (each series in a separate volume), edited by John Wood Warter, poetry and prose
 The Life and Correspondence of the Late Robert Southey, edited by Cuthbert Southey, biography
 Isaac Williams, The Christian Scholar

United States
 William Ellery Channing, The Woodman
 James T. Fields, Poems, Boston: William D. Ticknor and Company
 Caroline Howard Gilman, Verses of a Life-time
 Henry Beck Hirst, The Penance of Roland
 Oliver Wendell Holmes, Poems
 Richard Henry Stoddard, Foot-Prints
 Alfred Billings Street, Frontenac

Other
 Carl Jonas Love Almqvist, Songes, Sweden
 Petrus Augustus de Genestet, De Sint-Nicolaasavond ("Saint Nicholas's Eve"), Netherlands
 Micah Joseph Lebensohn, Harisut Troya, translation of Virgil's Aeneid after Schiller, Lithuania, Hebrew language
 Elias Lönnrot, comp., Kalevala, new version, Finland
 Fazal Shah Sayyad, Sohni Mahiwal, India, Punjabi language
 Christian Winther, Til Een ("To Someone"), Denmark

Births
Death years link to the corresponding "[year] in poetry" article:
 July 22 - Emma Lazarus (died 1887), American
 July 30 - Lettie S. Bigelow (died 1906), American
 August 1 - William Larminie (died 1900), Irish poet and folklorist
 August 23 -  William Ernest Henley (died 1903), English poet, critic and editor
 September 3 - Sarah Orne Jewett (died 1909), American regional fiction writer and poet
 September 21 - Edmund Gosse (died 1928), English poet, critic and memoirist
 October 7 - James Whitcomb Riley (died 1916), American dialect poet
 November 18 - Libbie C. Riley Baer (died 1929), American patriotic poet
 December 23 - Stine Andresen (died 1927), German

Deaths

Birth years link to the corresponding "[year] in poetry" article:
 January 6 - Hartley Coleridge (born 1796), English poet and writer
 January 26 - Thomas Lovell Beddoes (born 1803), English poet, dramatist and physician
 February 8 - France Prešeren (born 1800), Slovenian Romantic poet
 February 19 - Bernard Barton (born 1784), English Quaker poet
 May 28 - Anne Brontë (born 1820), English novelist and poet (tuberculosis)
 June 20 - James Clarence Mangan (born 1803), Irish poet (cholera)
 July 7 - Goffredo Mameli (born 1827), Italian patriot and poet
 July 31 - Sándor Petőfi (born 1823), Hungarian poet and revolutionary (probably killed in Battle of Segesvár)
 October 7 - Edgar Allan Poe (born 1809), American short-story writer, poet and editor
 December 1 - Ebenezer Elliott (born 1781), English "Corn Law rhymer"
 date unknown — Cynthia Taggart (born 1801), American poet

See also

 19th century in poetry
 19th century in literature
 List of years in poetry
 List of years in literature
 Victorian literature
 French literature of the 19th century
 Golden Age of Russian Poetry (1800–1850)
 Young Germany (Junges Deutschland) a loose group of German writers from about 1830 to 1850
 List of poets
 Poetry
 List of poetry awards

Notes

19th-century poetry
Poetry